was a king of the Ryukyu Kingdom, the founder of the Second Shō dynasty.

Early life and rise to power
Kanamaru was born into a family of peasant farmers on Izena Island, a tiny island which lies off the northwestern coast of Okinawa Island. It is said that his parents died when he was around twenty and undertook to provide for his aunt and uncle, brother and sister, and his wife, whom he married at a very young age.

In one year in which the island had suffered from a particularly severe drought, the rice paddies of Kanamaru's family were found to be full of water; accused of having stolen the water, Kanamaru was forced to flee his home, and ended up in Ginama, in the northern region (Kunigami) of Okinawa Island.

After several years living in Ginama, there too some type of dispute or disagreement between Kanamaru and his neighbors emerged. Leaving Ginama, he traveled to Shuri, the capital of the Ryukyu Kingdom, in 1441, and became a servant or retainer to the prince, Shō Taikyū. He was also granted territory, and made .

There emerged a difference of opinion between Kanamaru, and Shō Toku, who succeeded Shō Taikyū as king in 1461, possibly over the king's costly military efforts on the island of Kikai, leading Kanamaru to leave Shuri and retire to Uchima. Shō Toku died shortly afterwards, however, and it is said that in the ensuing discussions among the elder bureaucrats to choose a successor, Kanamaru was selected by popular demand, and thus came to the throne, taking the royal name Shō En. Historian George H. Kerr, however, points out that official histories produced in the following centuries were written with the patronage of Shō En's successors; also that the circumstances surrounding Shō Toku's death remain something of a mystery, and the traditional account may simply indicate that there was a shift in allegiances among the aristocrats and bureaucrats towards Kanamaru, or that those parties in support of Kanamaru simply outnumbered those on the side of the late king.

Reign

Shō En thus established the Second Shō dynasty, taking on the honorary surname granted the kings of Ryukyu by the Ming dynasty (and later, Qing dynasty) of China. He also banned members of the former Shō dynasty from high government office, and from marrying into the new royal family, and took steps to elevate the prestige of his own family. His father came to be honored as King of Izena, and a formal tomb was constructed for Shō En's parents on Izena Island. Shō En also named his sister high priestess, or "noro", of Izena; the lineage of high priestesses descended from her continued until the 20th century.

His reign marked the beginning of an institutional shift in the royal government, away from rule by a charismatic or otherwise gifted individual leader, i.e. the king, and towards a more bureaucratic system, with the king at its center.

Shō En's childhood wife is believed to have died, or otherwise separated from Kanamaru, before he rose to prominence at Shuri. He had his first son with his second wife, Yosoidon. Shō En died in 1476, after ruling for only a few years, and was succeeded by his brother Shō Sen'i, to Yosoidon's chagrin. Presently, the high priestess, daughter of the late king and Yosoidon, received a divine message indicating that Shō Sen'i should abdicate in favor of his nephew, son of Shō En, who then took the throne as Shō Shin.

See also 
 Imperial Chinese missions to the Ryukyu Kingdom

Notes

References
 Kerr, George H. (1965). Okinawa, the History of an Island People. Rutland, Vermont: C.E. Tuttle Co. OCLC 39242121

Second Shō dynasty
Kings of Ryūkyū
1415 births
1476 deaths
15th-century Ryukyuan monarchs